Michael Fergus Bowes-Lyon, 18th and 5th Earl of Strathmore and Kinghorne, 16th Viscount Lyon, 18th Lord Lyon and Glamis, 25th Lord Glamis, 16th Lord Glamis, Tannadyce, Sidlaw and Strathdichtie, and 6th Baron Bowes,  (7 June 1957 – 27 February 2016), styled Lord Glamis between 1972 and 1987, was a British politician and soldier, and a  first cousin, once removed of the late Queen Elizabeth II. He was usually known to family and friends as Mikey Strathmore.

Family and background
Lord Strathmore was the only son of Michael Bowes-Lyon, 17th Earl of Strathmore and Kinghorne, and his wife, Mary Pamela McCorquodale (b. 1932). He was a grandnephew of the late Queen Elizabeth The Queen Mother and a first cousin, once removed, of the late Queen Elizabeth II.

He was educated at Sunningdale School, Eton College, the University of Aberdeen, and RMA Sandhurst. He rose to the rank of captain in the British Army (serving with the Scots Guards). He succeeded his father as 18th Earl of Strathmore and Kinghorne in 1987.

Marriage and children
Lord Strathmore was married three times.

On 14 November 1984, he married Isobel Charlotte Weatherall (born ), great-granddaughter of Henry Keswick and sister of businessman Percy Weatherall, Tai-pan of Jardine Matheson; her elder sister Catherine Nony Weatherall was married to Sir Nicholas Soames as his first wife. 

They were separated in 2003 and were divorced in 2005. They had three children:

 Simon Bowes-Lyon, 19th Earl of Strathmore and Kinghorne (b. 18 June 1986)
 Hon. John Fergus Bowes-Lyon (b. 1988)
 Hon. George Norman Bowes-Lyon (b. 1991)

On 24 November 2005 at Glamis Castle he married Dr. Damaris E. Stuart-William, a clinical psychologist. They were separated in 2007 and were divorced in 2008. They had one child, a son:

 Hon. Toby Peter Fergus Bowes-Lyon (b. March 2005) (legitimised upon the marriage of his parents)

On 4 August 2012, he married Karen Baxter (née Orrock), who survived him.

Arms

References

External links

1957 births
2016 deaths
People educated at Eton College
18
Scots Guards officers
Michael Bowes-Lyon, 18th Earl of Strathmore and Kinghorne
People educated at Sunningdale School
Alumni of the University of Aberdeen
Pages of Honour
Conservative Party (UK) Baronesses- and Lords-in-Waiting
Deputy Lieutenants of Angus
Earls in the Peerage of the United Kingdom
Strathmore and Kinghorne